Burhan Qurbani (born in Erkelenz on 15 November 1980) is a German film director, writer and actor of Afghan origin. His directing, writing, and acting works include Shahada (2010), 20xBrandenburg (2010 TV documentary), and Illusion (2007 short film). His modern day adaption of Alfred Döblin's modern classic novel Berlin Alexanderplatz was selected for the main competition of the 2020 Berlin International Film Festival.

Notable works

Shahada

Shahada is a 2010 German drama film which narrates the fates of three German-born Muslims in Berlin whose paths collide as they struggle to find a middle ground between faith and modern life in western society. The film was nominated for the Golden Bear at the 60th Berlin International Film Festival.

20xBrandenburg
20xBrandenburg is a 16-minute German TV documentary directed by Qurbani, released in October 2010.

We Are Young. We Are Strong
 
We Are Young. We Are Strong (in German, Wir sind jung. Wir sind stark) is a 2014 German drama film directed by Qurbani, a fictionalized account of the 1992 xenophobic Rostock-Lichtenhagen riots. It was one of eight films shortlisted by Germany to be their submission for the Academy Award for Best Foreign Language Film at the 88th Academy Awards, but it lost out to Labyrinth of Lies.

Berlin Alexanderplatz

Awards
The awards won by Qurbani include
Prize of the Guild of German Art House Cinemas for Shahada (2010) film
Jury Award (Made in Hamburg), including the 2008 German Film Critics Prize for the short film Illusion (2007).

Personal life
Qurbani is from Afghanistan and belongs to the Hazara ethnic group. His family moved to Germany during the Soviet invasion of Afghanistan.

References

External links 

Afghan emigrants to Germany
German film directors
German-language film directors
German people of Hazara descent
Living people
Hazara film directors
1980 births
Naturalized citizens of Germany